Amelia Gray (born August 17, 1982) is an American writer. She is the author of the short story collections AM/PM (Featherproof Books), Museum of the Weird (Fiction Collective Two), and Gutshot (Farrar, Straus and Giroux), and the novels THREATS (Farrar, Straus and Giroux), and Isadora (Farrar, Straus and Giroux). Gray has been shortlisted for the PEN/Faulkner Award for Fiction and her television writing has been nominated for a WGA Award.

The New York Times called Gray's stories "leaps of faith, brave excursions into the realms of the unreal." while the Los Angeles Times defined her style as  “akin to the alternately seething and absurd moods of David Lynch and Cronenberg.” Of THREATS, NPR said "Amelia Gray's psychological thriller takes us to the brink between reality and delusion."

Gray is a member of Giving What We Can, a community of people who have pledged to give at least 10% of their income to effective charities.

Bibliography

Novels 
THREATS (Farrar, Straus and Giroux, 2012)
Isadora (Farrar, Straus and Giroux, 2017)

Short story collections 
AM/PM (Featherproof Books, 2009)
Museum of the Weird  (Fiction Collective Two, 2010)
Gutshot (Farrar, Straus and Giroux, 2015)

Other short stories
 "Labyrinth"
 "How He Felt"
 "Device"
 "The Swan as Metaphor for Love"
 "These Are the Fables"
 "The Inheritance"
 "The Odds"

Filmography

Television 

Mr. Robot (2017 - 2018)
Maniac (2018)
Gaslit (2022)

Short films 

"Curated" (dir. Gillian Jacobs) (2018)
"Waste" (dir. Justine Raczkiewicz) (2017)

Video games
Telling Lies (2019)
Immortality (2022)

Awards and honors

Winner
 2010: Ronald Sukenick Innovative Fiction Award
 2016: New York Public Library Young Lions Fiction Award

Nominated
 2008: Amanda Davis Highwire shortlist
 2008: DIAGRAM Innovative Fiction finalist
 2012: Dylan Thomas University of Wales Prize longlist
 2012: PEN/Faulkner Award for Fiction shortlist
 2016: Shirley Jackson Prize for Fiction (single author collection)
 2019: WGA Award (Adapted Long Form) with Nick Cuse, Cary Joji Fukunaga, Danielle Henderson, Mauricio Katz, Patrick Somerville, and Caroline Williams

References

External links 
 

1982 births
Living people
American surrealist novelists
American women novelists
American women short story writers
Fabulists
American surrealist writers
Magic realism writers
21st-century American novelists
Arizona State University alumni
Texas State University alumni
Writers from Tucson, Arizona
21st-century American women writers
American surrealist artists
Women surrealist artists
American women screenwriters
American television writers
21st-century American short story writers
Novelists from Arizona
PEN/Faulkner Award for Fiction winners
Screenwriters from Arizona
American women television writers
21st-century American screenwriters